Rav Idi bar Abin Naggara (or Idi bar Abin, or Idi ben Abin, or Rav Idi b. Avin (I), or Ada bar Abin) was a Jewish Babylonian rabbi who lived around 350 CE (fourth generation of amoraim).

Biography
He was the son of R. Abin Naggara, who likely worked as a carpenter (Naggara = "the carpenter"), and who came from Nerash or Nerus (נרשאה) in Babylonia. It is said that Rav Huna once passed the door of R. Abin and, when seeing the house lit by Shabbat candles, remarked that "Two great men will issue hence", since it is stated that "He who habitually practises [the lighting of] the lamp will possess scholarly sons". Indeed, he then had two scholarly sons: Idi and Hiyya.

Idi married a woman of Kohen descent and thus ate the foreleg, the jaws, and the maw. His sons R. Shesheth and R. Shisha were ordained to teaching. 

Idi acquired his Torah knowledge from R. Amram and Rav Chisda. He also delivered papers in the name of R. Isaac b. Ashian, most of them in the Aggadah, and most likely he was also his pupil. Idi gave an explanation in the presence of Rav Yosef, had discussions with Abaye on various occasions, and likewise gave explanations in the presence of Rabbah. He also had occasion to appear in the court of Rav Chisda. His pupils were Rav Papa and R. Huna b. Joshua, who were hosted at one of his sons' houses. Idi was considered the main authority in Nerash, where he introduced a certain law. Idi seems to have moved at a later period to Shekanzib, where he had occasion to receive Papa and Huna, whom he treated in a somewhat slighting manner.

References

Talmud rabbis of Babylonia